Ten Mile Lagoon wind farm is situated on a coastal ridge 16 kilometres west of Esperance in Western Australia, and it lies in the northern extremities of the reliable Roaring Forties winds. It was Australia's first commercial wind farm that is still operating, and consists of nine 225 kW Vestas wind turbines giving a total generating capacity of  just over 2 Megawatts. The farm was established in October 1993, after the successful operation of a smaller experimental wind farm at Salmon Beach, Esperance.

Esperance is an isolated town and it is not connected to the electricity grid.  Before the installation of wind turbines, the electrical needs of Esperance town and surrounding districts were supplied solely from a diesel power station. The Ten Mile Lagoon wind farm serves the Esperance community in conjunction with the power station and complements the electricity generated by the gas turbines.

Considerable care has been taken in the design and construction of the wind farm to ensure the least possible disturbance to the natural environment.

See also

Wind power in Australia

References

External links
Wind energy in Western Australia

Goldfields-Esperance
Wind farms in Western Australia